Pink Tape is the second studio album by South Korean girl group f(x). The album was released on July 29, 2013, by S.M. Entertainment. Pink Tape is the first studio album by f(x) in over two years, the last being the repackage of their first album Hot Summer in 2011, and the first Korean release in over a year since 2012's Electric Shock.  The album peaked at the number one position on multiple music charts internationally including Billboard's World Albums and South Korea's Gaon charts.

Pink Tape garnered widespread critical acclaim; the album was the only K-pop album to be featured on US music channel Fuse's "41 Best Albums of 2013" and was named the "Greatest K-pop Album of the 2010s" by Billboard. "Rum Pum Pum Pum" was ranked at number 59 on Billboard'''s "100 Greatest Girl Group Songs of All Time" list. In a panel of 47 music and pop culture critics organized by The Hankyoreh and Melon, it was ranked at number 96 in their list of the Top 100 Korean Albums of All Time, making it the only album by an idol group to make the list.

Background and development
On March 6, 2013, member Sulli hinted about the possibility of a new f(x) release on her me2day account. Later in March, f(x) performed at the SXSW music festival in Austin, Texas, becoming the first K-Pop act to do so. While in the United States, f(x) flew to Los Angeles to rehearse choreography for the upcoming album with choreographer Kevin Maher. Maher and member Amber Liu later tweeted pictures of them rehearsing. While in Los Angeles, the group also filmed a sketch with Anna Kendrick for comedy website Funny or Die. While backstage the group did an interview with the Mnet America show "Danny From L.A.", during which members Amber and Krystal Jung stated they were working on choreography for a new song but had "no idea" when it was due to be released. Amber later added that they hadn't recorded the title track yet and were in a process of "picking and choosing".

In June 2013, a clip from an upcoming variety show starring f(x) entitled "Go f(x)!" was leaked onto video sharing site Daily Motion. It showed the group rehearsing choreography with Kevin Maher. On July 9, an S.M. Entertainment representative stated that they were currently planning f(x)'s comeback but "[we] are still looking into a specific comeback date".

Release and promotion
On July 17, S.M. Entertainment announced that f(x) would return to the South Korean music market with their second full-length studio album, Pink Tape , on July 29, 2013, after a year of absence. That day S.M. uploaded a film onto their official YouTube account, which contained a behind-the-scenes video showing the photo shoot for the album's jacket and previewed the track "Shadow".  On July 23, Pink Tapes track listing was confirmed, with a total of 12 tracks being featured on the album. The same day, the album's cover art and an album preview medley were revealed. Pink Tape was released on July 29, 2013, in digital and physical formats. On July 25, Mnet premiered the "Go! f(x)" special.

Composition
"Rum Pum Pum Pum", the album's single, is a dance-pop song with exotic hand drums, whiplash-y snares, funky sixties' guitar riffs, and synthesized squirt. Lyrically, it expresses first love on a wisdom teeth. f(x) compare themselves to the pesky molars in another one of their typically bizarre metaphors, with lyrics like, “Attention boys! I’m a bit different / I pushed aside all the others and took my place,” and, “I will pierce through your heart’s wall and grow.” The song topped the Billboard K-Pop Hot 100 chart, marking the first number one single for the group on the Billboard Korea charts. The music shows f(x) dancing to choreography by Jillian Meyers. It features three sets: one white, sparkling set, another pink room with glossy pink borders, and red room with lights on the sides. Throughout the video, the camera focuses on choreography, and zooms in on each group member walking on the white set room with floating flowers.

"Shadow" is an alternative pop song that features a few non-mainstream instruments such as xylophone chimes to produce its unique sounds. The song was composed and arranged by a team of songwriters that included the British singer-artists Sophie Michelle Ellis-Bextor and Cathy Dennis, and the American music producer Rob Fusari. Dennis made her debut production in K-pop with "Shadow". The lyrics were penned by Jun Gan-di, who also wrote "Rum Pum Pum Pum".

"Step" an electro house song. The arrangement makes use of heavy instrumentals including beats, bass and the saxophone. "Step" as well as the last track of the album, "Ending Page", were both composed and arranged by the veteran songwriters Fingazz and Glen Choi, members of the music production firm Artisans Music. Both made their entrance in the South Korean music industry with this debut collaboration with f(x). The French entertainer Aria Crescendo, also took participation in the production of the song. The lyrics were penned by lyricist Jo Yun-gyeong.

"Goodbye Summer" marks the first time Amber has self-composed a track and also the first time the music producer team NoizeBank has collaborated with f(x) in composition. Gen Neo of NoizeBank handled the arrangement of the piece using mostly acoustic instruments to produce its background music. Amber also raps while the vocalists Luna, Krystal and guest vocalist D.O. of Exo take on the chorus, verses, and belting in the song. Amber initially wrote the lyrics in English, while Kim Young-hoo wrote all-new Korean lyrics (though keeping Amber's English rap section). According to Amber, Krystal was instrumental in getting the song on the album as she advocated for its inclusion after hearing the demo from Amber's music player. Amber would later go on to record an English version of the song with her original lyrics on her solo EP Beautiful with guest vocals featuring Eric Nam.

"Airplane" belongs to the 'reversed' electronic-dance music genre and uses heavy instrumentals. The song was composed and arranged by a team of Norwegian music producers and songwriter Martin Mulholland from Dsign Music, and co-produced by Julia Fabrin and Tim McEwan.  Julia Fabrin made her debut composition in the K-Pop music industry with "Airplane". The lyrics were penned by lyricist Misfit.

"No More" is a retro styled track in the soul music genre. The instrumental makes use of xylophones similar to "Shadow".  The song's origins come from a track by American singer Ariana Grande that was recorded during sessions for her first album Yours Truly''. Titled "Boyfriend Material", the song was a favorite of Grande's (as it was one of the first songs she wrote) but didn't make it onto the album's final track list.  Executives at Republic Records then sold the rights to the song to SM Entertainment. The song was slightly re-arranged and composed by the veteran songwriters Alex Cantrall, Dwight Watson and Jeff Hoeppner. As Grande's lyrics were not purchased, the song's lyrics were penned by Dana, who made her debut in songwriting career with "No More".

Reception

Accolades

Track listing

Charts

Weekly charts

Monthly charts

Yearly charts

Release history

References

External links
 
 

F(x) (group) albums
SM Entertainment albums
Genie Music albums
2013 albums
Synth-pop albums by South Korean artists
Albums produced by Lee Soo-man
Korean-language albums
Electropop albums